Thomas Hobson may refer to

 Thomas Hobson (postal carrier) (c. 1544–1631), English postal carrier
 Thomas Hobson (actor) (born 1982), American actor
 Thomas Hobson (cricketer) (born 1994), South African cricketer